The Gibraltar Labour Party was a political party in Gibraltar.  They described themselves as a progressive socialist organisation and stated that their formation was prompted by the need for a strong opposition to the government. They were founded and led by Daniel Feetham, who left the Gibraltar Socialist Labour Party.

They opposed dialogue with Spain and wanted to change the Constitution of Gibraltar, and support the right of Gibraltarians to decide their own constitutional arrangements under the principle of self-determination. They were also in favour of further integration with the United Kingdom.

They had proposed policies for the improvement of the quality and availability of housing in Gibraltar. They proposed that no individual should serve as Chief Minister for more than two terms, and called for a more transparent form of funding of political parties.

Elections
In the 2003 General Election to the Gibraltar House of Assembly, the party won 9,445 votes  (or 8.0% of the popular vote) and no seats. This is the largest number of votes (in terms of both percentage and actual number of votes) for a Gibraltarian political party that has not won a seat in the Legislature throughout its electoral history.

Election results

Parliament of Gibraltar

Merger
In 2005, the Labour Party merged with the governing Gibraltar Social Democrats, retaining the GSD name and leadership.

References

Labour parties
Defunct political parties in Gibraltar
Political parties established in 2003
2003 establishments in Gibraltar
Political parties disestablished in 2005
Socialism in Gibraltar